The 2010 Oklahoma elections were held on November 2, 2010. The primary election was held on July 27. The runoff primary election was held August 24.

The Republican Party swept every statewide election and took full control of Oklahoma government for the first time in the state's history, flipping every statewide executive office from Democratic to Republican control, as well as expanding its majorities in the legislature. An extremely socially conservative state, Oklahoma has not voted for a Democrat in a presidential election since 1964, but remained reliably Democratic at the state level well into the 2000s. This election marked a new and decisive alignment in the state's partisanship at all levels of government, with the GOP continuing to make gains in almost every election since.

Overview
NOTES:
Bob Anthony and Jeff Cloud were not on the 2010 ballot due to the staggered election terms of the Corporation Commission.
With Todd Lamb's election to Lieutenant Governor, one Oklahoma Senate seat remains vacant, to be filled in a January 2011 special election.

Executive Branch Before Election

Legislature Before Election

Congressional Delegation Before Election

Executive Branch After Election

Legislature After Election

Congressional Delegation After Election

Governor

The 2010 gubernatorial election determined the successor of incumbent Democratic Governor Brad Henry, who, due to term limits placed on him by the Oklahoma Constitution, could not seek re-election.

Candidates
Democrats
 Jari Askins - current Lieutenant Governor of Oklahoma
 Drew Edmondson - current Attorney General of Oklahoma

Republicans
 Roger L. Jackson - retired businessman, former President of the Oklahoma Office Machine Dealers Association (OOMDA)
 Mary Fallin - former Lieutenant Governor and current Congresswoman for Oklahoma's 5th Congressional
 Randy Brogdon - current state senator
 Robert Hubbard - business owner of Piedmont, Oklahoma's "Hubbard Ranch Supply"

Primary

Democrat

Republican

General

Lieutenant Governor
The 2010 lieutenant governor election determined the successor of incumbent Democratic Lieutenant Governor Jari Askins, who stepped down to run for Governor.

Candidates
Democrats
Kenneth Corn - current State Senator

Republicans
Bernie Adler - Oklahoma City real estate investor
Todd Lamb - current State Senator
John A. Wright - current State Representative
Bill Crozier - former Republican candidate for Superintendent of Public Instruction
Paul F. Nosak - Oklahoma City resident

Independent
Richard Prawdzienski - Edmond resident

Primary
Corn ran unopposed in the Democratic primary.

Republican

General

State Auditor
The 2010 State Auditor and Inspector election was the first election for the office of State Auditor and Inspector since former Democratic State Auditor Jeff McMahan was forced to resign in 2008 due to corruption charges.

Governor Brad Henry appointed fellow Democrat Steve Burrage to serve out the remainder of McMahan's unexpired term.  Burrage then sought a full term in office but lost to Gary Jones, who was making his third run for the office.

Article 6, Section 19 of the Oklahoma Constitution places one additional requirement upon the State Auditor and Inspector beyond the other constitutional requirements for those seeking statewide offices. The auditor must have at least 3 years of prior experience as an "expert accountant" before seeking office. (The term "expert accountant" is not defined but is generally understood to require that the officeholder must be a certified public accountant.)

Candidates
Democrats
Steve Burrage - incumbent State Auditor

Republican
David Hanigar - Pocasset certified public accountant and United States Navy submariner during Vietnam War
Gary Jones - Lawton certified public accountant, former Comanche County Commissioner and current Chairman of the Oklahoma Republican Party

Primary
Burrage ran unopposed in the Democratic primary.

Republican

General

Attorney General
The 2010 Attorney General election determined the successor of incumbent Democratic Attorney General Drew Edmondson, who stepped down to run for Governor but lost in the Democratic Party primary.

Candidates
Democrats
Jim Priest - Oklahoma City defense attorney

Republicans
Ryan Leonard - former state prosecutor in Canadian County and former senior aide to former U.S. Senator Don Nickles
Scott Pruitt - former State Senator from Tulsa

Primary
Priest ran unopposed in the Democratic primary.

Republican

General

State Treasurer
The 2010 State Treasurer election determined the successor of incumbent Democratic State Treasurer Scott Meacham, who declined to seek a second full term in office.

Candidates
Democrats
Stephen E. Covert - Midwest City resident

Republicans
Owen Laughlin - lawyer and businessman from Woodward, former State Senator
Ken Miller - current State Representative, current Chair of the House Appropriations and Budget Committee and economics professor at Oklahoma Christian University

Primary
Covert ran unopposed in the Democratic primary.

Republican

General

Superintendent of Public Instruction
The 2010 Superintendent of Public Instruction election determined the successor of incumbent Democratic Superintendent Sandy Garrett, who declined to seek a sixth full term in office.

Candidates
Democrats
Jerry Combrink - former Boswell Public Schools superintendent
Susan Paddack - current State Senator from Ada

Republican
Janet Barresi - charter school founder, dentist, and school speech pathologist from Edmond
Brian S. Kelly - educator from Edmond

Independents
Richard E. Cooper - former educator

Primary

Primary
Republican

General

Labor Commissioner
Incumbent Democratic Labor Commissioner Lloyd Fields was defeated in an attempt to win a second full term in office.

Candidates
Democrats
Lloyd Fields - incumbent Labor Commissioner

Republican
Mark Costello - businessman from Edmond
Jason Reese - labor attorney from Oklahoma City

Primary
Fields ran unopposed in the Democratic primary.

Republican

General

Insurance Commissioner
Incumbent Democratic Insurance Commissioner Kim Holland was defeated in an attempt to win a second full term in office.

Candidates
Democrats
Kim Holland - incumbent Insurance Commissioner

Republicans
John Doak - insurance agent from Tulsa
Mark Croucher - insurance agent from Jenks
John P. Crawford - former Insurance Commissioner (1995–1999)

Primary
Incumbent Holland ran unopposed in the Democratic Primary.

Republican Primary

Republican Runoff Primary

General

Corporation Commissioner
The 2010 Corporation Commissioner election was for the seat currently held by incumbent Republican Commissioner Dana Murphy, who won her primary election.  As the Democratic Party did not field a candidate, and no independent candidate sought office, Murphy was thus elected as Commissioner.

Candidates
Democrats
none

Republicans
Dana Murphy - incumbent Corporation Commissioner
Tod Yeager - Del City resident

Primary

Republican

General
Murphy did not have a Democratic or independent opponent; thus, she was elected unopposed.

US Senator

The 2010 US Senatorial election gave incumbent Republican Senator Tom Coburn a second full term in office.

US Representatives

All five Oklahoma seats in the United States House of Representatives were up for election in 2010.  However, incumbent Tom Cole in District 4 had no opposition in the general election.

State Senators
24 of the 48 seats in the Oklahoma Senate were up for election in 2010.

State Representatives
All 101 seats in the Oklahoma House of Representatives were up for election in 2010.

Judicial
These races were "retention" votes based on Oklahoma's use of the Missouri Plan for electing judicial nominees.

Oklahoma Supreme Court

Oklahoma Court of Civil Appeals

State Questions

SQ 744
State Question 744 would have amended the Oklahoma Constitution by adding a new article: Article 13-C - Amount of money the State provides to support common schools.

The proposed Constitutional amendment would have mandated that the Oklahoma Legislature spend no less than the average amount spent by "neighboring states" (those states which border Oklahoma: Missouri, Texas, Kansas, Arkansas, Colorado and New Mexico) on "common education" (defined as grades pre-kindergarten through high school) on an annual, per-student basis. If the surrounding-state average ever declined, the legislature would be required to spend the same amount as it did the year before. The measure required that increased spending begin in the first fiscal year after its passage and that the surrounding-state average be met in the third fiscal year after passage.

The proposed amendment did not provide a funding source for the new spending requirements and was therefore overwhelmingly defeated.

SQ 746
State Question 746 would amend various State laws relating to voting requirements. It requires that each person appearing to vote present a document proving their identity. The document must meet the following requirements:
It must have the name and photograph of the voter.
It must have been issued by the federal, state or tribal government.
It must have an expiration date that is after the date of the election.

No expiration date would be required on certain identity cards issued to person 65 years of age or older. In lieu of such a document, voters could present voter identification cards issued by the County Election Board. A person who cannot or does not present the required identification may sign a sworn statement and cast a provisional ballot. Swearing to a false statement would be a felony.

If approved, the measure would become effective July 1, 2011.

SQ 747
State Question 747 would amend the Oklahoma Constitution by placing term limits on all Statewide elected officials. All officials would be allowed to serve no more two terms in office. Terms served need not be consecutive for the limits to apply.

SQ 748
State Question 748 would amend the Oklahoma Constitution by amending Article 5, Sections 11A and 11B. The measure would change how the districts of the Oklahoma Legislature are apportioned.

Currently, the Apportionment Commission is responsible for setting district boundaries every ten years if the Legislature itself fails to do so. The Apportionment Commission, as currently established, is composed of the Attorney General, the State Treasurer and the State Superintendent of Public Instruction. The measure would change the commission's name to the Bipartisan Commission on Legislative Apportionment and would increase the number of members from three to seven. The President pro tempore of the Oklahoma Senate would appoint one Democrat and one Republican, the Speaker of the Oklahoma House of Representatives would appoint one Democrat and one Republican, and the Governor of Oklahoma would appoint one Democrat and one Republican.

The Lieutenant Governor of Oklahoma would chair the commission and would be a nonvoting member. It requires orders of apportionment to be signed by at least four members of the commission.

SQ 750
This measure would amend the Oklahoma Constitution by altering the initiative petitions and with referendum petitions process by changing the number of signatures required for such petitions.

The following voter signature requirements would apply:
8% must sign to propose law
15% must sign to propose to change the State Constitution.
5% must sign to order a referendum.

These percentages are based upon the State office receiving the most total votes at the last General Election when the Governor is on the ballot. The measure's basis does not use General Elections with the President on the ballot. More votes are usually cast at Presidential General Elections. Thus, the measure would generally have a lowering effect on the number of required signatures.

SQ 751
This measure would amend the Oklahoma Constitution by adding a new Article to the Constitution. That Article would deal with the State's official actions. It dictates the language to be used in taking official State actions must be the English language. However, it allows for Native American languages could also be used and, when Federal law so requires, other languages could also be used.

The term "official actions" is not defined. The Oklahoma Legislature could pass laws determining the application of the language requirements. No lawsuit based on State law could be brought on the basis of a State agency's failure to use a language other than English nor could such a lawsuit be brought against political subdivisions of the State.

SQ 752
This measure would amend Section 3 of Article 7-B of the Oklahoma Constitution. The amendment adds two at-large members to the Oklahoma Judicial Nominating Commission. At-large members can come from any Oklahoma congressional district. The President Pro Tempore of the Oklahoma Senate would appoint one of the new at-large members and the Speaker of the Oklahoma House of Representatives would appoint the other. At-large members cannot be lawyers, can not have a lawyer in their immediate family. Nor can more than two at-large members be from the same political party. This would raise the total membership on the commission from 13 to 15.

SQ 754
This measure would have added a new section, Section 55A of Article 5, to the Oklahoma Constitution. Under the measure, the Constitution could not have required the Oklahoma Legislature to fund state functions based on:

1. Predetermined constitutional formulas,
2. How much other states spend on a function,
3. How much any entity spends on a function.

Under the measure, these limits on the Constitution's power to control appropriations would have applied even if:

1. A later constitutional amendment changed the Constitution, or
2. A constitutional amendment to the contrary was passed at the same time as this measure.
The Question was in direct opposition toward State Question 744 which also appeared on the ballot.

SQ 755
This measure amended the Constitution of Oklahoma. It requires courts to rely solely on federal and state law when deciding cases. It forbids courts from considering or using international law or using Sharia.

The results of State Question 755 have not been officially certified by the Oklahoma Election Board due to an injunction filed in Federal Court by the Council on American–Islamic Relations (CAIR). CAIR is challenging its constitutionality under the Establishment Clause and Free Exercise Clause of the Constitution of the United States. A Federal District Court in Oklahoma City temporarily blocked certification of the election results, calling the measure an unconstitutional violation of the First Amendment because the measure conveys a message that the state favors one religion or particular belief. The state election board appealed the ruling to the Tenth Circuit Court of Appeals, but that court unanimously upheld the ruling blocking the amendment:

SQ 756
This measure adds a new section, Section 37 to Article 2, of Oklahoma Constitution. It defines "health care system." It prohibits making a person participate in a health care system, prohibits making an employer participate in a health care system, and prohibits making a health care provider provide treatment in a health care system. It would allow persons and employees to pay for treatment directly, it would allow health care provider to accept payment for treatment directly, it would allow the purchase of health care insurance in private health care systems and it would allow the sale of health insurance in private health care systems.

The Question was proposed as an opposition toward the Patient Protection and Affordable Care Act.

SQ 757
This measure amends Section 23 of Article 10 of the Oklahoma Constitution. It would increase the amount of surplus revenue which goes into the Constitutional Reserve Fund. The amount would go from 10% to 15% of the funds certified as going to the General Revenue fund for the preceding fiscal year.

See also
Government of Oklahoma
Oklahoma House of Representatives
Oklahoma Senate
Politics of Oklahoma
Oklahoma Congressional Districts

References

External links
Oklahoma Election Board homepage

 
Oklahoma